Sands Point may refer to:

Sands Point, New Jersey
Sands Point, New York
Sands Point Country Day School
Sands Point Light
Sands Point Seaplane Base
Sands Point Stakes